FUSD is an acronym used to refer to the following school districts:

Flagstaff Unified School District
Fontana Unified School District
Fremont Unified School District
Fresno Unified School District
Florence Unified School District